Anita Nyberg (born 1940) is a Swedish professor in Gender Perspectives in Work and Economics at the Centre for Gender Studies at Stockholm University. She was Secretary of the Swedish Committee on the Distribution of Economic Power and Economic Resources between Women and Men ("Kvinnomaktutredningen").

References

External links
Institutionen för etnologi, religionshistoria och genusvetenskap. Stockholm University.

Academic staff of Stockholm University
Swedish feminists
1940 births
Living people
Swedish women academics